Constantin Poenaru (April 8, 1842–1912) was a Romanian general.

Born in Bucharest, Poenaru attended the local officers’ school from 1859 to 1861, followed by the École supérieure de guerre in Paris. A second lieutenant from 1861, he rose to captain in 1867 and to major in 1872, and commanded the military engineers’ battalion from 1872 to 1877. When the Romanian War of Independence broke out in 1877, he saw action during the Siege of Plevna. Gheorghe Șonțu and Valter Mărăcineanu were under his command.

In 1880, Poenaru was promoted to lieutenant colonel, and he became inspector of military engineers. In 1882, he was made commander of the first engineers’ regiment in the Romanian Army. In 1884, he was placed in charge of the officers’ school. Promoted to colonel in 1886 and to brigadier general in 1891, he headed an army corps from 1896. He taught strategy both at the officers’ academy and at the Higher War School. In June 1894 he became War Minister, serving until October 1895. Together with Iacob Lahovary, Chief of the Romanian General Staff, he pursued institutional reform, modernizing the army's structure and cementing the special status of the general staff.

From 1898 to 1901, Poenaru, from 1900 a division general, himself served as General Staff Chief, with Lahovary as War Minister. The two continued to collaborate, with Poenaru focused on updating mobilization plans and battle regulations. He also drew up plans for an eventual occupation of Austro-Hungarian ruled Transylvania, foreseeing a vigorous offensive from multiple directions. Finally, in the interests of monitoring the border with Austria-Hungary, he detached infantry battalions to the mountain passes of the Carpathians.

Poenaru was awarded the Order of the Crown, commander, grand officer and grand cross; the Order of the Star of Romania, officer and grand officer; the Order of the Cross of Takovo; and the Order of Saint Anna.

Notes

References
Teofil Oroian, Șefii statului major general român 1859-2000, pp. 48–50. Bucharest: Editura Europa Nova, 2001, 

1842 births
1912 deaths
Military personnel from Bucharest
Romanian Land Forces generals
Romanian military personnel of the Russo-Turkish War (1877–1878)
Romanian Ministers of Defence
Chiefs of the General Staff of Romania
Academic staff of Carol I National Defence University
Commanders of the Order of the Crown (Romania)
Grand Officers of the Order of the Crown (Romania)
Grand Crosses of the Order of the Crown (Romania)
Officers of the Order of the Star of Romania
Grand Officers of the Order of the Star of Romania
Recipients of the Order of the Cross of Takovo
Recipients of the Order of St. Anna